Agdistis cypriota is a moth in the family Pterophoridae. It is known from Cyprus, Turkey and Tunisia.

References

Agdistinae
Moths of Europe
Moths described in 1983